Chladni is a small lunar impact crater that lies near the northwest edge of Sinus Medii, in the central part of the Moon. The crater is named for German physicist and musician Ernst Chladni who, in 1794, wrote the first book on meteorites. The rim of the crater is roughly circular, and there is a small central floor at the midpoint of the sloping inner walls. This feature has a higher albedo than the surrounding terrain. It is connected by a low ridge to the rim of the crater Murchison, which lies to the northwest. Due east of Chladni is the larger Triesnecker.

References

External links

Chladni at The Moon Wiki
Chladni at the USGS's Planetary Names website

Impact craters on the Moon